Giacomo Matiz (born January 10, 1986 in Gemona del Friuli) is an Italian freestyle skier, specializing in moguls.

Matiz competed at the 2014 Winter Olympics for Italy. He placed 14th in the first qualifying round in the moguls, not advancing. He then finished 11th in the second qualifying round, again failing to advance.

As of April 2014, his best showing at the World Championships is 14th, in the 2009 dual moguls.

Matiz made his World Cup debut in February 2005. As of April 2014, his best World Cup finish is 8th, in a moguls event at Beida Lake in 2011–12. His best World Cup overall finish in moguls is 27th, in 2012–13.

References

1986 births
Living people
Olympic freestyle skiers of Italy
Freestyle skiers at the 2014 Winter Olympics
People from Gemona del Friuli
Italian male freestyle skiers
Sportspeople from Friuli-Venezia Giulia
21st-century Italian people